Cameron LaCroix, aka camo, cam0, camZero, cmuNNY, is an American computer hacker best known for the hacking of Paris Hilton's cellular phone, accessing LexisNexis, and defacing Burger King's Twitter account. He has also been convicted of intentionally causing damage to a protected computer system, obtaining information from a protected computer system, wire fraud, and aggravated identity fraud. Prosecutors said victims of the teen's actions have suffered about $1 million in damages. Pursuant to a plea agreement signed by the juvenile in August 2005, he received 11 months in a federal juvenile detention facility. In January 2007 his supervised release was revoked due to possession of a cell phone.

In June 2008, an indictment for Cameron LaCroix was returned from New Bedford Superior Court in Bristol County on a series of counts for computer offenses.

LaCroix was previously held at the Federal Medical Center, Devens. He was released on April 5, 2021 according to the Federal Bureau of Prisons.

Further reading
  Daniel Bukszpan (23 October 2013); AMERICAN GREED: THE FUGITIVES – The new muggers: People who committed shocking cybercrimes. CNBC.
 Kevin Collier (4 July 2014) Feds finally press charges against great Burger King Twitter hacker of 2013. Daily Dot.
 Associated Press (28 October 2014) New Bedford hacker gets 4 years in prison. The Providence Journal.
 Dan Goodin (3 July 2014); Feds unmask mystery hacker who “hamburgled” Burger King Twitter account. Ars Technica.
 Milton J. Valencia (28 October 2014); Apologetic New Bedford hacker gets 4-year jail sentence. The Boston Globe.
 Veronica Linares (3 June 2014); Paris Hilton hacker faces new charges after breaking into community college's network. United Press International.
 Adam Greenberg (3 June 2014); '"FBI charges Massachusetts man with computer hacking, payment card theft". SC Magazine.
 John Hawes (26 June 2014); Serial hacker Cameron Lacroix gets four year jail term after taking plea bargain. Naked Security, Sophos.
  Shea Bennett (8 July 2014); Twitter @BurgerKing Hacker Given Four Year Jail Term. adweek.
 David Kushner (23 November 2015); The Hacking of Hollywood. Wired''.
 USAO, Massachusetts (13 September 2019); Recidivist Hacker Sentenced for Violating Supervised Release Conditions. US Department of Justice; U.S. Attorney’s Office, District of Massachusetts.

References

New Bedford, Massachusetts
Hacking (computer security)
American computer criminals
Year of birth missing (living people)
Living people